Bayındır is a village in Silifke district of Mersin Province, Turkey. It is situated in the Taurus Mountains. The population of Bayındır is 145 as of 2011.

References

Villages in Silifke District